Kyar Kyar Kyite Kyite, is a 2019 Burmese comedy film starring Myint Myat, Min Maw Kun, Khin San Win, Nyi Nyi Maung, Lin Linn and Ma Htet. The film, produced by Half & Half Film Production, premiered in Myanmar on August 29, 2019.

Cast
Myint Myat as Chit Loon Thu
Min Maw Kun as Kyaw Gyi
Ma Htet as Zar Zar
Khin San Win
Nyi Nyi Maung
Lin Linn

References

2019 films
2010s Burmese-language films
Burmese comedy films
Films shot in Myanmar
2019 comedy films